The Ukraine Open is an annual badminton tournament held in Ukraine. The tournament is part of the Badminton Europe tournament series and is leveled in BWF International Challenge. The inaugural edition was held in 2022.

Winners

Performances by nation

See also
Ukraine International

References 

Badminton tournaments in Ukraine
Sports competitions in Ukraine